Pieter Nijs or Nys (April 15, 1624 – June 16, 1681), was a Dutch Golden Age painter.
Nijs was born in Amsterdam.
According to the RKD he was a pupil of Hendrik Martensz Sorgh. Besides in Amsterdam, he worked in Rotterdam, Leuven and Antwerp and various towns in Germany. He is known for genre works, farm scenes, and portraits.

Nijs died in Amsterdam.

References

Pieter Nijs on Artnet

1624 births
1681 deaths
Painters from Amsterdam
Dutch Golden Age painters
Dutch male painters